Asokore is a town in the New Juaben Municipal District of the Eastern Region of Ghana.

References

See also

Populated places in the Eastern Region (Ghana)